Edsel Ford Fung (often spelled Fong) was an American restaurant server from San Francisco, California. He was called the "world's rudest, worst, most insulting waiter" and worked at Sam Wo restaurant.

Life
Fong was born and raised in San Francisco's Chinatown. He worked the second floor of the Sam Wo Restaurant on Washington Street. (The restaurant name means "three in peace", a reference to its founding partners.) As head waiter, Fong greeted visitors with an admonition to "Sit down and shut up!" He was known for calling patrons "retarded" and "fat", criticizing people's menu choices and then telling them what they should order, slamming food on the table,  and complaining about receiving only 15% tips. An imposing man with a crew cut hair style, he also was notorious for seating people with strangers, forgetting orders, cursing, spilling soup on customers, hazing newcomers, refusing to provide forks or English menu translations, and busing tables before diners were finished.

Fong was made famous by columnist Herb Caen, who often described the misanthropic Fong during his visits to Sam Wo. Caen would interview Fong on matters of local politics and gossip, then reprint Fong's Yogi Berra-like responses, which Fong would in turn proudly show to his loyal regulars. Caen included Fong in his guide of things to do in San Francisco, under "58. See the world's rudest waiter". Shirley Fong-Torres described Edsel Fong as one of the main attractions of Sam Wo in her 2008 book The Woman Who Ate Chinatown, saying that customers "came to see and be verbally abused by Edsel". Although genuinely rude, his style was self-conscious and his role at the restaurant was not just to serve food but also to be a resident "entertainer" and "madman", with one longtime patron recalling him as "[not] rude. He was actually certifiably crazy. He didn't act that strange to locals, but the tourists got to him after a while."

Legacy

Fong was a regular recurring character in Armistead Maupin's series of Tales of the City novels, and was played by Arsenio 'Sonny' Trinidad in the 1993 Channel 4 miniseries. Fong had a cameo in the 1981 Chuck Norris film An Eye for an Eye. Robin Williams referred to Fong in his 1997 eulogy of Herb Caen: "'Oops, she (Pamela Harriman) is missing our table, going right to God's.' I hope they have a waiter like Edsel Ford Fong who goes, 'No water here. Only wine!'" A series of club-level bistros at Oracle Park are named "Ford Fong's" in his honor. He is also memorialized by a portrait on "Gold Mountain", a mural depicting Chinese contributions to American history on Romolo Place in North Beach, a few blocks from the restaurant. He is spoken of by Jerry Kamstra in his memoir of pre-hippie San Francisco, The Frisco Kid.

Fong's daughter, also a waiter at Sam Wo, picked up the mantle after his death. For decades, she was rude and irascible with customers—until the closure of Sam Wo, still listed in one tourist guidebook as being where Fong practiced a "wicked sarcasm [that] took on aspects of performance art".  The restaurant announced its closure in April 2012, citing the age of the building and kitchen as contributing factors. Sam Wo reopened in 2015 at a new location on Clay Street.

See also
 History of Chinese Americans in San Francisco
 Roast (comedy)

References

External links
account of meeting Edsel Ford Fong by Charles Bukowski (archived)

1984 deaths
American people of Chinese descent
Restaurant staff
1927 births
People from Chinatown, San Francisco
People from San Francisco